Frenchman Bay is a locality in Western Australia.

History
The site is in the traditional settlement area of the Mineng Aboriginal tribe.

Frenchman Bay, first named in 1887, has been a significant site in the recent history of the entire region. George Vancouver, the first European explorer of King George Sound, landed here in 1791. A water source at Whalers Beach was subsequently visited again and again by seafarers. The water supply later enabled the establishment of whaling stations and was a destination for day trippers and tourists. Just north of what is now Goode Beach, a settler settled for the first time on the peninsula. Later a hostel and a campsite were built.

Originally, the name Frenchman Bay referred to a larger area that also included Goode Beach and the Vancouver Peninsula to the north. In 2000, Vancouver Peninsula was split from Frenchman Bay.

References

External links 

Great Southern (Western Australia)